The 1929 Chicago aldermanic election was held on February 26, 1929, with a runoff on April 2, to elect the 50 members of the Chicago City Council. The elections were non-partisan. Held in the middle of mayor William Hale Thompson's term, it would be the penultimate midterm election; four-year terms for aldermen were adopted in 1935, coinciding with the mayoral election that year.

All told, despite the non-partisan nature of the elections, candidates affiliated with the Republican Party won 27 seats and those affiliated with the Democratic Party won 23. 11 seats were decided by means of a runoff election, and a Republican candidate won all but one of those elections. Six incumbent aldermen were defeated in the first round, and an additional four fell in the runoffs, all by Republican candidates. Four aldermen, all Democratic, were returned without opposition.

Issues and endorsements
The main issue of the elections was the influence of Mayor Thompson over the City Government and individual aldermen. Senior US Senator and former Governor Charles Deneen fronted the main slate of anti-Thompson candidates. Many reformers had hoped and even proclaimed that the election would "wipe...Thompson off the political map." The reform-minded Chicago Tribune and Municipal Voter's League endorsed candidates based on their perceived independence from Thompson.

The elections were held on a backdrop of violence throughout the city. In particular the race for the so-called "Bloody Twentieth" ward had been marked by the murder in April 1928 of African-American reform candidate for committeeman Octavius Granady during the Pineapple Primary. The Daily Chronicle in DeKalb reported that "Another surprise of the election - for the police at least - was that no one was murdered, kidnapped, or slugged," although it attributed such lack of violence to the heavy patrol of polling places by police officers that compelled Police Commissioner William Russell to set aside his investigation of the recent Saint Valentine's Day Massacre. It was also subject to some disputes in electoral law, with such sitting aldermen as Sheldon Govier of the 9th ward and Joseph McDonough of the 13th raising accusations of fraudulent petitions against many of their opponents given the 40% increase in the number of candidates from the 1927 elections and some aldermen disputing a filing deadline that sitting aldermen Coyle, Haffa, and Hoellen had missed.

The Daily Chronicle asserted that four of the six aldermen defeated in the first round had been Thompson supporters. Nevertheless, the election was generally considered a failure for the reformers. Many of Thompson's closest allies, including his former African-American floor leader Louis B. Anderson of the 2nd Ward, retained their seats. Particularly devastating was the loss of 20th ward incumbent A.J. Prignano, whom the Municipal Voter's League had extolled as "the best alderman [the] ward has had in many years," to William V. Pacelli, a candidate fronted by the Ellers, who were implicated in Granady's murder. Furthermore, of the nine candidates endorsed by the Tribune and Municipal Voter's League leading up to the runoff elections (not including contests where neither or both candidates were endorsed), only Frank Konkowski of the 31st Ward won his contest. Ultimately, Thompson's rule over the City would continue unabated until the 1931 elections.

Results

See also
 1927 Chicago mayoral election

References

Chicago City Council elections
1929 United States local elections
Chicago aldermanic primary election